Anarsia valvata is a moth in the family Gelechiidae. It was described by Rose and Pathania in 2003. It is found in India (Himachal Pradesh).

References

Moths described in 2003
valvata
Moths of Asia